Ramada Jarvis was a chain of 4 star and 5 star hotels mostly located throughout the mainland of the United Kingdom, with a few managed internationally. The group's 42 hotels in the UK and five overseas went into liquidation in 2011 after experiencing cash flow problems.

History
The business was founded by John Jarvis who floated it on the London Stock Exchange in 1996 when it was valued at about £495 million. The company was taken private in 2003 in a management buyout for £159 million.

Many of the Ramada Jarvis hotels in Britain had Sebastian Coe Health clubs.  The clubs were also open to private members.  The clubs had full gyms and pools with steam rooms, saunas, spa and massage rooms and hairdressers.

Ramada Jarvis went into liquidation on 30 September 2011 as a result of a severely restricted cash flow caused by the Group's principal bankers calling in loans before their term.  26 hotels were acquired by Jupiter Hotels Limited, a 50:50 joint venture between Patron capital and West Register, part of the Global Restructuring Group of the Royal Bank of Scotland Group.  Those hotels have been re-branded Mercure under a franchise agreement with Accor.  The joint venture investors are injecting £40m, with debt financing of £71m provided by RBS, HSBC and Bank of Ireland, which were the original lenders to Jarvis.

Not all the Ramada Jarvis hotels were included in the Jupiter Hotels deal, so the Ramada Heathrow and the Ramada Glasgow Airport continue to trade as Ramada hotels, each as a franchise. In August 2012 the Ramada Heathrow property was re-branded as the DoubleTree by Hilton London Heathrow Airport. In September 2016 the Ramada Glasgow Airport was rebranded as Courtyard by Marriott Glasgow Airport.

The Ramada Jarvis at Junction 25 of the M1 was privately bought and now operates under the Best Western banner.

References

Hotel chains in the United Kingdom
Hotel and leisure companies of the United Kingdom
Companies formerly listed on the London Stock Exchange
Defunct hotel chains
Ramada